Waleran, Galeran, or Walram is a Germanic first name, common in the Middle Ages, that may refer to:

People
Waleran I of Limburg (died 1082)
Waleran the Hunter (fl. 1086)
Walram (bishop of Naumburg) (r. 1091–1111)
Waleran of Le Puiset (died 1126), crusader
Waleran, Duke of Lower Lorraine (c. 1085–1139)
Waleran de Beaumont, Earl of Worcester (1104–1166)
Waleran (bishop of Rochester) (died 1184)
Galeran V de Beaumont, Count of Meulan (died 1191)
Walram I, Count of Nassau (died 1198)
Waleran de Beaumont, 4th Earl of Warwick (1153–1204)
Waleran III, Duke of Limburg (c. 1165–1226)
Walram II, Count of Nassau (died 1276)
Waleran IV, Duke of Limburg (died 1279)
Galeran of Ivry (fl. 1272–1280)
Waleran I, Lord of Ligny (died 1288)
Walram, Count of Jülich (died 1297)
Walram of Jülich (died 1349), archbishop of Cologne
Waleran II, Lord of Ligny (died 1354)
Walram, Count of Sponheim-Kreuznach (died 1380)
Walram IV, Count of Nassau-Idstein (1354–1393)
Walram of Thierstein (died 1403)
Waleran III, Count of Ligny (1355–1415)

Other
Baron Waleran, a title in the British Peerage

See also
Walerand (disambiguation)
Galeran de Bretagne, a chanson de geste

de:Walram
ja:ワレラン
nl:Walram
pl:Walram